Interstate 240 (I-240) is an Interstate Highway in Oklahoma, United States, that runs  west from I-40 to I-44 in southern Oklahoma City. After its terminus in southwest Oklahoma City, the main I-240 roadbed becomes I-44 and Airport Road toward Will Rogers World Airport. The Interstate overlaps State Highway 3 (SH-3), the longest Oklahoma state highway, for its entire length.

Major destinations along the route include Tinker Air Force Base and the heavily populated Southside of Oklahoma City. With just under  of commercial space, I-240 is a major corridor of retail, industrial, and office space. , however, the corridor included some "pockets of shuttered stores and creeping shabbiness" and local planners were in the first stages of efforts to revitalize the corridor.

Route description
From the western terminus at I-44, I-240/U.S. Highway 62 (US-62)/SH-3 runs east toward I-35. This western half is the busier of the two sections, serving the Southside area of Oklahoma City and traffic headed to the airport. This segment has a configuration of ramps that causes much weaving and many accidents. An entrance ramp merges onto the highway, forming a new lane. This new lane then becomes an "exit only" lane for the next exit. However, the exits are not spaced very far apart, causing entering and exiting traffic to conflict. Signs were installed in October 2004 designating the western half of I-240 as the Keith Leftwich Memorial Loop in honor of a state senator who had died around that time. I-240 meets I-35 at a cloverleaf interchange. US-62 splits off to join with I-35 northbound at this interchange.

The section of I-240 east of I-35 exists primarily to serve the now-closed General Motors plant and Tinker Air Force Base. This section is much less traveled, having only four lanes (two in each direction) for much of its length. At I-240's eastern terminus with I-40, motorists traveling eastbound on I-240 are forced to merge onto I-40 eastbound—there is no I-40 westbound offramp. (Those wishing to take I-40 westbound must exit off of I-240  earlier at Anderson Road, a surface street, and travel on it northbound until they reach I-40, or continue east on I-40 before turning around at the next exit at Choctaw Road.)

History
The section of what is now I-240 between I-35 and current I-44 was already complete in 1965 as an alignment of US-62. When the Interstate route was initially established in the 1960s, I-240 ran from its current eastern terminus around the city, turning north at the present interchange with I-44, continuing on the present course of I-44 to its present southern junction with I-35. (I-44 ended near Edmond at the western end of the Turner Turnpike at the time.) I-240 thus nearly created a loop around the city, intersecting both I-35 and I-40 twice. The section east of I-35 to its eastern terminus at I-40 was completed in 1973. The entirety of the route was complete in 1976.

As part of Oklahoma's 75th anniversary (Diamond Jubilee) celebrations in 1982, the Oklahoma Department of Transportation (ODOT) extended I-44 to Lawton and Wichita Falls, Texas, along the H.E. Bailey Turnpike. This caused I-240 to be truncated to its current western terminus near Will Rogers World Airport.

Future
On August 2, 2021, the Oklahoma Transportation Commission approved an extension to the Interstate 240 designation to form a beltway around Oklahoma City.

ODOT Director Tim Gatz stated in the Transportation Commission meeting that the numbering change was primarily to aid in navigation using digital mapping and routing applications. Gatz also said, "If you look at the Interstate 240 designation on the loop around the Oklahoma City metropolitan area, we are finally to the point where we have a truly contiguous route there that can shoulder the burden of some of that transportation need in a loop format. That's common practice across the country, and you'll see that in many of the metropolitan areas, and that update will really be beneficial as far as everything from signage to how do you describe that route on a green-and-white sign." The designation still needs to be approved by the American Association of State Highway and Transportation Officials (AASHTO) and the Federal Highway Administration (FHWA) to take effect.

Exit list

References

External links

I-240 at OKHighways.com
I-240 at Kurumi.com
I-240 at AARoads

40-2
40-2 Oklahoma
240 Oklahoma
Transportation in Oklahoma County, Oklahoma
Transportation in Oklahoma City